James Ballantyne (1772–1833) was a Scottish editor and publisher.

James Ballantyne or Ballantine may also refer to:

James R. Ballantyne (1813–1864), Scottish orientalist
James Ballantine (politician) (1855–1896), New York politician
James Ballantine (1806–1877), Scottish artist and author
Jim Ballantyne, chairman of Airdrie United
Jim Ballantine (producer) (born 1955), American film producer
Jim Ballantine (ice hockey) (1967–2002), American ice hockey player

See also
James Ballantyne Hannay (1855–1931), Scottish chemist